Hwa&Dam Pictures (stylised as hwa&dam pictures) is a Korean drama production company and a subsidiary of Studio Dragon. It was founded on June 11, 2007 by former SBS drama producer Yoon Ha-rim.

Works

Managed people

Writers
 Kim Eun-sook
 Kwon Do-eun

Directors
 Baek Sang-hoon
 Jung Ji-hyun
 Lee Eung-bok

References

External links

Studio Dragon
Television production companies of South Korea
Mass media companies established in 2007
Companies based in Seoul
South Korean companies established in 2007